Motorsport of any type, or at any level, is dangerous by its very nature. However the nature of the media often means that only deaths in high-profile series, with mainstream TV coverage, are reported in the press. For example, the deaths of Dan Wheldon and Marco Simoncelli within a week of each other in 2011, received significant press attention while other recent deaths did not. This can give a misleading impression to the general public as to the number of deaths that occur in the sport as a whole. The list below shows drivers that have died racing in British national or club car racing series since 1970. The list only includes drivers to have died during a race and only those competing in British domestic series. The deaths are spread across the major existing circuits in the country, with only Knockhill and Rockingham Motor Speedway (opened 2001) not having any recorded driver deaths.

+ = Multiple drivers to have died in the same incident (see previous/following entry)

References

External links 
 Motorsport Memorial Homepage, searchable database on Motorsport deaths

Motorsport in the United Kingdom